Daniel Ethan Edelman (born April 28, 2003) is an American professional soccer player who plays as a midfielder for Major League Soccer club New York Red Bulls.

Club career

Youth
Born in Warren Township, New Jersey, Edelman was part of the youth system at the Players Development Academy (PDA) from 2015 to 2020. He also played prep soccer at Watchung Hills Regional High School. In 2020, Edelman joined the youth academy at Major League Soccer club New York Red Bulls.

New York Red Bulls
On July 17, 2020, Edelman was featured on the bench for New York Red Bulls II, the club's reserve affiliate, against Hartford Athletic. He came on as a late second half substitute as Red Bulls II were defeated 0–1. He then scored his first professional goal in the next match against Philadelphia Union II in the 56th minute to help Red Bulls II to a 5–1 victory. On March 24, 2021, Edelman signed a professional contract with New York Red Bulls II for the 2021 season. He became a regular starter for coach John Wolyniec, starting in 28 matches and scoring once.

On December 17, 2021, Edelman signed a homegrown player contract with New York Red Bulls starting from the 2022 season. On February 26, 2022, Edelman made his debut for the first team, coming on as a second half substitute in a 3-1 victory over San Jose Earthquakes in the opening match of the season. On May 10,  2022, Edelman made his first start for New York in a 3-0 victory over DC United, helping the club advance to Round of 16 in the 2022 U.S. Open Cup. On July 24, 2022, Edelman made his first league start for New York in a 4-3 victory over Austin FC at Q2 Stadium. Edelman scored his first professional goal on August 27, 2022 in a 3–1 victory against Inter Miami.

International career
Edelman has represented the United States at both the under-16 and under-20 levels.

Career statistics

Club

Honors
United States U20
CONCACAF U-20 Championship: 2022

References

External links
 Profile at New York Red Bulls

2003 births
Living people
People from Warren Township, New Jersey
Sportspeople from Somerset County, New Jersey
American soccer players
Association football midfielders
New York Red Bulls II players
New York Red Bulls players
USL Championship players
Homegrown Players (MLS)
Soccer players from New Jersey
United States men's youth international soccer players
Watchung Hills Regional High School alumni
United States men's under-20 international soccer players
Major League Soccer players
Jewish American sportspeople
Jewish footballers